Neomegalonema is a genus of bacteria. Up to now there is only one species of this genus known (Neomegalonema perideroedes).

References

 

Monotypic bacteria genera
Rhodobacterales
Bacteria genera